The 15th National Assembly of Pakistan is the legislature of Pakistan following the 2018 general election of members of parliament (MPs) to the National Assembly of Pakistan, the lower house of the bicameral Parliament of Pakistan. The National Assembly is a democratically-elected body consisting of 342 members, who are referred to as Members of the National Assembly (MNAs), of which 272 are directly elected members; 70 reserved seats for women and religious minorities are allocated to the political parties according to their proportion of the total vote.

Elections for 270 directly-elected seats in the National Assembly took place on 25 July 2018. The elections for the remaining two directly electable seats were postponed. As a result of the election, the Pakistan Tehreek-e-Insaf (PTI) became the single largest party, though without an overall majority. PTI won 149 seats in the National Assembly. Pakistan Muslim League (N) (PML-N) and Pakistan Peoples Party (PPP) secured 82 and 53 seats, respectively. Following the election, nine independent candidates joined PTI. Members of the 15th National Assembly took an oath on 13 August 2018, and marked the constitutional transition of power from one democratically-elected government to another for the second time in the history of Pakistan. It marked the constitutional transition of power from one democratically-elected government in Pakistan to another for the first time following the 2013 general election.

Asad Qaiser and Qasim Khan Suri of PTI were elected as the legislature's speaker and deputy speaker, respectively. On 17 August 2018, Imran Khan of PTI secured 176 votes and was elected the new Prime Minister of Pakistan for the first time, with the support of allied parties. Shahbaz Shareef won a PML-N leadership vote to succeed Syed Khurshid Ahmed Shah as permanent Leader of the Opposition in the National Assembly.

On 14 October 2018, by-election were held on 11 National Assembly seats. PTI and PML-N won four seats, each. Two were bagged by PML-Q and one seat was won by MMA.

On 3 April 2022, in an address to the nation, Prime Minister Imran Khan announced that he has advised President Arif Alvi to dissolve the assemblies. Hence, on the same day, the President dissolved the National Assembly on the Prime Minister's advice under Article 58 of the Constitution. Earlier in the day, National Assembly Deputy Speaker Qasim Khan Suri dismissed the no-confidence motion against Imran Khan, terming it against Article 5 of the Constitution.

On 7 April 2022, the Supreme Court of Pakistan ruled that the dismissal of the no-confidence motion by the deputy speaker and the subsequent dissolution of the National Assembly as unconstitutional and thus restored the assembly.

On 14 April 2022, 123 MNAs of the PTI resigned from the assembly.

Members

Membership changes

See also 

 List of members of the 1st National Assembly of Pakistan
 List of members of the 2nd National Assembly of Pakistan
 List of members of the 3rd National Assembly of Pakistan
 List of members of the 4th National Assembly of Pakistan
 List of members of the 5th National Assembly of Pakistan
 List of members of the 6th National Assembly of Pakistan
 List of members of the 7th National Assembly of Pakistan
 List of members of the 8th National Assembly of Pakistan
 List of members of the 9th National Assembly of Pakistan
 List of members of the 10th National Assembly of Pakistan
 List of members of the 11th National Assembly of Pakistan
 List of members of the 12th National Assembly of Pakistan
 List of members of the 13th National Assembly of Pakistan
 List of members of the 14th National Assembly of Pakistan
 List of members of the 15th National Assembly of Pakistan

See also
 No-confidence motion against Imran Khan

References

2018 Pakistani general election
Lists of members of the National Assembly of Pakistan by term
 
Lists of current office-holders in Pakistan
Pakistan